This is a list of rivers in Venezuela.

By drainage basin
This list is arranged by drainage basin, with respective tributaries indented under each larger stream's name.

Atlantic Ocean

Amazon Basin
 Amazon River (Brazil)
 Rio Negro
 Casiquiare canal
 Baria River
 Yatuá River
 Siapa River
 Pasimoni River
 Guainía River
 Conorochite River

Essequibo Basin
 Essequibo River (Guyana)
 Mazaruni River (Guyana)
 Cuyuni River
 Wenamu River
 Corumpo River
 Yuruarí River
 Supamo River
 Kamarang River

Orinoco Basin
 Orinoco River
 Rio Grande (distributary, empties into the Boca Grande)
 Barima River
 Amacuro River
 Cuyubini River
 Aguirre River
 Caño Araguao (distributary)
 Caño Mariusa (distributary)
 Caño Macareo (distributary)
 Caño Tucupita (distributary)
 Caño Mánamo (distributary, empties into the Gulf of Paria)
 Tigre River
 Morichal Largo River
 Urecoa River
 Caroní River
 Paragua River
 Asa River
 Uinebona River
 Carutu River
 Carrao River
 Churún River
 Icabarú River
 Acaruay River
 Aponguao River
 Cuquenán River
 Caris River
 Aro River
 Arisa River
 Carapo River
 Pao River
 Guaicupa River
 Cabrutica River
 Mapire River
 Caura River
 Mato River
 Erebato River
 Merevarí River
 Zuata River
 Iguana River
 Cuchivero River
 Manapire River
 Guariquito River
 Mocapra River
 Apure River
 Guárico River
 Orituco River
 Memo River
 Portuguesa River
 Guanare River
 Caño Guanaparo or Guanare Viejo
 Bocono River
 Tiznados River
 Pao River
 Cojedes River
 San Carlos River
 Tinaco River
 Turbio River
 Acarigua River
 Quache River
Caucagua River
 Masparro River
 Santo Domingo River
 Pagüey River
 Canagua River
 Caparo River
 Sarare River
 Uribante River
 Arauca River 
 Cunaviche River
 Matiyure River
 Orichuna River or Arichuna
 Chiviripa River
 Capanaparo River
 Suapure River
 Cinaruco River
 Parguaza River
 Meta River 
 Sipapo River
 Cuao River
 Autana River
 Guayapo River
 Atabapo River
 Ventuari River
 Parú River
 Marieta River
 Manapiare River
 Cunucunuma River
 Casiquiare canal (distributary) 
 Padamo River
 Matacuni River
 Ocamo River
 Mavaca River
 Manaviche River

Gulf of Paria
 Caño Mánamo listed under Orinoco
 Guanipa River
 Amana River
 San Juan River
 Guarapiche River

Caribbean Sea

 Manzanares River
 Neverí River
 Aragua River
 Unare River
 Güere River
 Tamanaco River
 Guapo River
 Tuy River
 Capayo River
 Aroa River
 Yaracuy River
 Tocuyo River
 Hueque River
 Monay River
 Pedregal River
 Maticora River
 Limón River
 Socuy River
 Guasare River

Lake Maracaibo
 Motatán River
 Chama River
 Escalante River
 Catatumbo River
 Zulia River
 Pamplonita River (Colombia)
 Táchira River
 Tarra River
 Tucuro River
 Apón River
 Palmar River

Lake Valencia
 Tapatapa River or El Limon
 Güey River
 Turmero River
 Aragua River
 Tocorón River
 Güigüe River
 Caño Central
 Cabriales River
 Los Guayos River
 Guacara River
 Ereigue River
 Cura River
 Mariara River

See also
List of rivers of the Americas by coastline

References

 León A, Rafael de. y Rodríguez Díaz, Alberto J. 1976: El Orinoco aprovechado y recorrido. Corporación Venezolana de Guayana y Ministerio de Obras Públicas. Caracas. 216p.
 Zinck, Alfred. 1986. Venezuelan Rivers. Cuadernos Lagoven Lagoven, S.A. Caracas. 64p. 
 Gines, H. 1992: Los grandes ríos suramericanos. Ediciones Corpoven. Caracas. 44p. 
 McNally, Rand. 1993: The New International Atlas.
Mapas de Venezuela (in Spanish)

Venezuela
 
Rivers of Venezuela